Tomas Rousseaux (born 31 March 1994) is a Belgian professional volleyball player. He is a member of the Belgium national team. At the professional club level, he plays for Valsa Group Modena.

His sister, Hélène is also a volleyball player, while their father, Emile is a volleyball coach.

Honours

Clubs
 National championships
 2012/2013  Belgian Cup, with Knack Roeselare
 2012/2013  Belgian Championship, with Knack Roeselare
 2013/2014  Belgian SuperCup, with Knack Roeselare
 2013/2014  Belgian Championship, with Knack Roeselare
 2014/2015  Belgian SuperCup, with Knack Roeselare
 2014/2015  Belgian Championship, with Knack Roeselare
 2016/2017  German SuperCup, with VfB Friedrichshafen
 2016/2017  German Cup, with VfB Friedrichshafen

References

External links

 
 Player profile at LegaVolley.it 
 Player profile at PlusLiga.pl 
 Player profile at Volleybox.net

1994 births
Living people
People from Jette
Sportspeople from Brussels
Belgian men's volleyball players
European Games competitors for Belgium
Volleyball players at the 2015 European Games
Belgian expatriate sportspeople in Italy
Expatriate volleyball players in Italy
Belgian expatriate sportspeople in Germany
Expatriate volleyball players in Germany
Belgian expatriate sportspeople in Poland
Expatriate volleyball players in Poland
AZS Olsztyn players
GKS Katowice (volleyball) players
Resovia (volleyball) players
Ślepsk Suwałki players
Modena Volley players
Outside hitters
21st-century Belgian people